Martin Mølster (11 October 1900 – 13 March 1968) was a Norwegian pentathlete.

He was born in Voss, and represented the club IL Bjart. He competed in pentathlon at the 1924 Summer Olympics, when he placed eleventh.

References

External links

1900 births
1968 deaths
People from Voss
Norwegian pentathletes
Olympic athletes of Norway
Athletes (track and field) at the 1924 Summer Olympics
Sportspeople from Vestland